Yakovlevskaya is a rural locality (a village) and the administrative center of Zaostrovskoye Rural Settlement of Vinogradovsky District, Arkhangelsk Oblast, Russia. The population was 310 as of 2010. There are 3 streets.

Geography 
Yakovlevskaya is located on the Nyuma River, 75 km southeast of Bereznik (the district's administrative centre) by road. Zherlyginskaya is the nearest rural locality.

References 

Rural localities in Vinogradovsky District
Shenkursky Uyezd